Cornelius Edward "Con" Walsh (24 April 1885 – 7 December 1961) was an Irish Canadian athlete who represented Canada at the 1908 Summer Olympics. He was born in Carriganimma. He won a bronze medal in the hammer throw, finishing third behind fellow Irishmen John Flanagan and Matt McGrath, both of whom represented the United States. Another Irishman, Robert Kerr also represented Canada at the same games. Walsh had earlier played Gaelic football and represented Cork.

Walsh also competed for both the Irish American Athletic Club and the New York Athletic Club. He was part of a group of Irish weight throwers that were collectively known as the "Irish Whales."

In 1910 Walsh set the record for throwing the 56 pound weight for height, breaking Pat McDonald's record by throwing the weight 16 feet 7/8 inches high (5.07 metres) at the second annual athletic meet of the New York Press Club Athletic Association.

References

External links
 
 Winged Fist Organization

1885 births
1961 deaths
Canadian male hammer throwers
Olympic bronze medalists for Canada
Athletes (track and field) at the 1908 Summer Olympics
Olympic track and field athletes of Canada
Cork inter-county Gaelic footballers
Canadian people of Irish descent
Irish male hammer throwers
Male weight throwers
Medalists at the 1908 Summer Olympics
Olympic bronze medalists in athletics (track and field)